Kalitvintsev, Kalytvyntsev,  is a surname of Russian origin. Notable people with the surname include:

 Yuri Kalitvintsev (born 1968), Ukrainian footballer and coach
 Vladyslav Kalitvintsev (born 1993), Ukrainian footballer, son of Yuri

Russian-language surnames